The Makarau River is a river of the Auckland Region of New Zealand's North Island.

The Tahekeroa River is a tributary of it.

See also
List of rivers of New Zealand

References

Rodney Local Board Area
Rivers of the Auckland Region
Kaipara Harbour catchment